Liz Jackson is an American education scholar and leader known for her work in philosophy of education and educational theory. She is currently a Professor and Head of the Department of International Education in the Faculty of Education and Human Development at the Education University of Hong Kong.  Previously she was associate professor at the University of Hong Kong, where she also served as the Director of the Master of Education Program and the Director of the Comparative Education Research Centre (CERC). She is also a Fellow and Past President (2018-2020) of the Philosophy of Education Society of Australasia (PESA). Jackson's work has earned numerous awards and honours internationally and in Hong Kong.

Biography 
Jackson earned a Bachelor of Arts degree in Social Sciences from Portland State University in Oregon in 2003, a Master of Philosophy degree in Politics, Democracy, and Education from the University of Cambridge (Newnham College) in 2005, and a Doctor of Philosophy degree in Educational Policy Studies from the University of Illinois at Urbana-Champaign in 2009. She was the first in her family to graduate from college.

After completing her PhD, Jackson joined the United States Peace Corps as a volunteer from 2009 to 2011. During that time she worked in South Africa as an Education Policy Specialist focusing on educational capacity building based in rural areas of the North-West and KwaZulu-Natal Provinces. In 2011, she worked as Policy Coordinator for the Higher Colleges of Technology, United Arab Emirates, based in Abu Dhabi, overseeing higher educational policy across the 17-campus college system and leading the System Survey Review and Institutional Effectiveness committees.

In 2012, she joined the University of Hong Kong as an assistant professor, and continued there as a tenured associate professor from 2017 to 2020. While at the University of Hong Kong, she served as the Deputy Director and the Director of the Master of Education Programme and was part of the University Committee on Gender Equality and Diversity, the Working Group on Equity and Inclusion on Campus and the Common Core Curriculum General Education Committee. In 2018 she was elected as the Director of the Comparative Education Research Centre, after serving as an elected member of the Management Committee from 2014 to 2018. She was the first woman to take the helm of the Centre in its 18-year history. While at the University of Hong Kong, Jackson also served as a visiting scholar at the University of Waikato, New Zealand, Syracuse University, and the University of Glasgow. Additionally, from 2018-2020, she served as the President of the Philosophy of Education Society of Australasia, becoming the youngest person and the first person from outside of Australia and New Zealand to be elected President in its 50-year history. 

In 2020, Jackson took up the post of Professor at the Education University of Hong Kong. While at the Education University of Hong Kong, she became the founding leader of the Virtues in Ethics East and West Platform, a Managing Committee Member of the Centre for Religious and Spirituality Education, and Co-Chair of the Women Researchers in Education Network. She became the Head of the Department of International Education and the leader of the university's Diversity, Equity and Social Inclusion Research Group in 2022.

In addition to her leadership in the Philosophy of Education Society of Australasia, Jackson has served key roles in other academic societies. Since 2019, she has been the Hong Kong Representative to the Executive Board of the Comparative Society of Asia; she has also been the elected Communications Director (from 2018 to 2020) and the elected Treasurer (from 2020-2022) of the Philosophical Studies in Education Special Interest Group of the American Educational Research Association. Jackson has also served as Deputy Editor for Educational Philosophy and Theory, a leading international journal in philosophy of education, since 2016. She has served on the editorial boards of the journals Multicultural Educational Review, International Journal of Comparative Education and Development, International Journal of Multicultural Education, Policy Futures in Education, and Educational Theory. Her publications include six authored books, eleven edited books, and over 200 journal articles or book chapters on topic including multiculturalism, civic education, Islamophobia, gender studies, critical and anti-racist pedagogy, Hong Kong education, virtues and moral education, global studies of education, educational research, and education for sustainable development. She has been invited to speak as a keynote speaker or distinguished scholar at conferences and other events in Chile, Canada, Germany, the United States, the United Kingdom, Australia, New Zealand, Japan, India, Iran, Oman, the Philippines, Thailand, Macau, Korea, Taiwan, and China.

Scholarly career
Through her writings, Jackson has consistently sought to bridge educational theory and practice while examining the diversity of the human experience. Her first sole-authored book, Muslims and Islam in U.S. Education: Reconsidering Multiculturalism (2014) explored the complex interface that exists between U.S. school curriculum, teaching practice about religion in public schools, societal and teacher attitudes toward Islam and Muslims, and multiculturalism as a framework for meeting the needs of minority group students. It presented multiculturalism as a concept that needs to be rethought and reformulated in the interest of creating a more democratic, inclusive, and informed society. The book won the Philosophy of Education Society of Australasia’s inaugural Book Awards in 2015 and the University of Hong Kong Research Output Prize for Education 2014-15. It was also positively reviewed in the journals Religious Education, Educational Philosophy and Theory, Educational Theory, and the Journal of Philosophy of Education.

Jackson’s second book focused on citizenship education from a global view. Questioning Allegiance: Resituating Civic Education (2019). Winner of the 2020 American Educational Studies Association’s Critics’ Choice Award, the book offered a new framework for students and academics by questioning existing thinking and shifting the focus of attention from the right balance to strike between local, national, and global allegiances to the more fundamental question of what counts as “local,” “national,” and “global,” and what might be involved in cultivating allegiances to them. It considered allegiance to not just transnational but also sub-global “civilisations.” The book was featured in a review symposium in the journal Educational Philosophy and Theory. The text was described by critics as “a capacious examination of the role of education in helping people to live together well in multiple spatial and geographical contexts… a finely wrought, crucial contribution for our ambivalent ever-localizing and ever-globalizing time,” and as "a major contribution to the theoretical literature on civic education” with an “impressive breadth of scholarship.”
 
Jackson’s third major contribution to philosophy of education shifted more clearly to the role of education for emotional wellbeing as it relates to moral and civic cultivation. Beyond Virtue: The Politics of Educating Emotions (2020), published by Cambrdige University Press, analysed the best practices of educating emotions considering not just the psychological benefits of emotional regulation, but also how calls for educating emotions connect to the aims of society. The book explores psychology's understanding of emotions, “the politics of emotions,” and philosophy. It also discusses education for happiness, compassion, gratitude, resilience, mindfulness, courage, vulnerability, anger, sadness, and fear.  This book was awarded the American Educational Studies Association Book Award in 2021, and positively reviewed in the journals Educational Philosophy and Theory and Journal of Moral Philosophy.

More recently, Jackson’s scholarship has been oriented more to issues in local educational contexts. Her fourth sole-authored book, Contesting Education and Identity in Hong Kong (2020) examined the intersection of youth civic engagement, identity, and protest in Hong Kong. The book was described as “a must-read for researchers, scholars, students, and policymakers in Hong Kong studies and in the general field of politics, identity and education," and “a must-read book if you wish to know how education and identity in Hong Kong is struggling for its directions at a crossroads."
 
Jackson has also co-authored two books with Tanzanian colleagues focused on Tanzanian education: Educational Assessment in Tanzania: A Sociocultural Perspective with Joyce Kahembe (2020), and Corporal Punishment in Preschool and at Home in Tanzania: A Child Rights Challenge with Reuben Sungwa and Joyce Kahembe (2022). In addition she has published extensively in the areas of East Asia studies, critical theory, and gender and sexuality.

Honours and awards
	Named Fellow of the Philosophy of Education Society of Australasia, 2021.
	Critics’ Choice Award, the American Educational Studies Association, for Beyond Virtue: The Politics of Educating Emotions, 2021.
	Honourable Mention, the Philosophy of Education Society of Australasia, for Beyond Virtue: The Politics of Educating Emotions,  in 2021.
	Critics’ Choice Award, the American Educational Studies Association, for Questioning Allegiance: Resituating Civic Education, 2020.
	Honourable Mention, the Philosophy of Education Society of Australasia, for Questioning Allegiance: Resituating Civic Education, 2020.
	Elected Treasurer, Philosophical Studies in Education, 2020.
	Presidential Research Award, the Korean Association for Multicultural Education, for “Harmony versus Homogenisation: Multiculturalism for Ethnic Minorities in China,” 2020.
	Student-Supervisor Publication Award, the University of Hong Kong, for “Multiculturalism in Chinese History in Hong Kong: Constructing Chinese Identity,” 2020.
	Elected Hong Kong Representative, Comparative Education Society of Asia, 2019.
	Book Award, the Philosophy of Education Society of Australasia, for Post-Truth, Fake News: Viral Modernity & Higher Education, 2019.
	Elected Communications Director, Philosophical Studies in Education, 2018.
	Elected President of the Philosophy of Education Society of Australasia, 2018. 
	Vice President of the Philosophy of Education Society of Australasia, 2017. 
	Silver Medal, the European Exhibition of Creativity and Innovation Conference, for Handbook of Research on Applied Learning Theory and Design in Modern Education, 2017.
	Asia Pacific Representative, UNESCO Mahatma Gandhi Institute of Education for Peace and Sustainable Development, 2016.
	Research Output Prize for Education, the University of Hong Kong, for Muslims and Islam in US Education: Reconsidering Multiculturalism, 2016.
	Book Award, the Philosophy of Education Society of Australasia, for Muslims and Islam in US Education: Reconsidering Multiculturalism, 2015. 
	Elected Member Representative of the Philosophy of Education Society of Australasia, 2015. 
	Early-Career Conference Award, the University of Hong Kong, for “Altruism, Non-Relational Care, and Global Citizenship Education,” 2015.
	Fellow of the Cambridge Overseas Scholars Trust, 2005.

Bibliography

Authored books
	Reuben Sungwa, Liz Jackson & Joyce Joas Kahembe, Corporal Punishment in Preschool and at Home in Tanzania: A Child Rights Challenge. Singapore: Springer, 2022. 
	Liz Jackson, Contesting Education and Identity in Hong Kong. London: Routledge, 2021. 
	Joyce Kahembe & Liz Jackson, Educational Assessment in Tanzania: A Sociocultural Perspective. Singapore: Springer, 2020.
	Liz Jackson, Beyond Virtue: The Politics of Educating Emotions. Cambridge: Cambridge University Press, 2020. S
	Liz Jackson, Questioning Allegiance: Resituating Civic Education. Oxon/London/New York: Routledge, 2019. 
	Liz Jackson, Muslims and Islam in U.S. Education: Reconsidering Multiculturalism. Oxon/London/New York: Routledge, 2014.

Edited books 
	Marek Tesar, Michael A. Peters & Liz Jackson (Eds.), The Ethical Academy: The university as an Ethical System. Oxon/New York: Routledge, 2022. 
	Liz Jackson & Michael A. Peters (Eds.), Race and Racism: An Educational Philosophy and Theory Reade', Volume XIV. New York: Routledge, 2022. 
	Liz Jackson & Michael A. Peters (Eds.), Marxism, Neoliberalism, and Intelligent Capitalism: An Educational Philosophy and Theory Reader, Volume XII. New York: Routledge, 2022. 
	Michael A. Peters & Liz Jackson (Eds.), From Radical Marxism to Knowledge Socialism: An Educational Philosophy and Theory Studies Reader, Volume XI. New York: Routledge, 2022. 
	Michael A. Peters, Tina Besley, Marek Tesar, Liz Jackson, Peter Jandric, Sonja Arndt & Sean Sturm, The Methodology and Philosophy of Collective Writing: An Educational Philosophy and Theory Reader, Volume X. Oxon/New York: Routledge, 2021.
	Liz Jackson (Ed.), Asian Perspectives on Education for Sustainable Development. Oxon/New York: Routledge, 2020. 
	Liz Jackson & Michael A. Peters (Eds.), Feminist Theory in Diverse Productive Practices: An Educational Philosophy and Theory Gender and Sexualities Reader, Volume VI. Oxon/London/New York: Routledge, 2019. 
	Liz Jackson & Michael A. Peters (Eds.), From ‘Aggressive Masculinity’ to ‘Rape Culture’: An Educational Philosophy and Theory Gender and Sexualities Reader, Volume V. Oxon/London/New York: Routledge, 2019. 
	Elena Railean, Gabriela Walker, Atilla Elci & Liz Jackson (Eds.), Handbook of Applied Learning Theory and Design in Modern Education. (2 vol.) Hershey, PA: IGI Global, 2016.

Selected articles
	Amy N. Sojot & Liz Jackson, ‘No Single Way Takes Us to Our Different Futures’: An Interview with Liz Jackson, Educational Philosophy and Theory, 2022.
	Liz Jackson, Humility and Vulnerability, or Leaning In? Personal Reflections on Leadership and Difference in Global Universities, Universities and Intellectuals, 1:1 (2021), 24–29.
	Liz Jackson & Ana Luisa Muñoz-García, Reaction is Not Enough: Decreasing Gendered Harassment in Academic Contexts in Chile, Hong Kong, and the United States, Educational Theory, 69:1 (2019), 17–33.
	Liz Jackson, Relations of Blood? Racialization of Civic Identity in Twenty-First Century Hong Kong, Discourse: Studies in the Cultural Politics of Education, 40:6 (2019), 761–772.
	Liz Jackson, The Smiling Philosopher: Emotional Labor, Gender, and Harassment in Conference Spaces, Educational Philosophy and Theory, 51:7 (2019), 693–701. 
	Liz Jackson, Leaning Out of Higher Education: A Structural, Postcolonial Perspective, Policy Futures in Education, 15:3 (2017), 295–308.
	Liz Jackson, Learning about Diversity in Hong Kong: Multiculturalism in Liberal Studies Textbooks, The Asia-Pacific Education Researcher, 26:1 (2017), 21–29.
	Liz Jackson, Why Should I Be Grateful? The Morality of Gratitude in Contexts Marked by Injustice, Journal of Moral Education, 45:3, 276-290 (2016).
	Liz Jackson, Religion in Hong Kong Education: Representation in Liberal Studies Textbooks, Asian Anthropology, 14:1, 43-56 (2015).
	Liz Jackson, Islam and Muslims in U.S. Public Schools since September 11, 2001, Religious Education, 106:2, 162-180 (2011). 
	Liz Jackson, Images of Islam in U.S. Media and Their Educational Implications, Educational Studies, 46:1, 3-24 (2010).

Citations

External links
 
 Liz Jackson Curriculum Vitae
 Institutional homepage
 Educational Philosophy and Theory
 Philosophy of Education Society of Australasia

1980 births
Living people
21st-century American non-fiction writers
21st-century American philosophers
21st-century American women writers
21st-century American writers
Philosophy of education
Feminist philosophy
Philosophers of sexuality
University of Illinois Urbana-Champaign alumni
Alumni of Newnham College, Cambridge
Portland State University alumni
American ethicists
American feminist writers
American women philosophers
Virtue ethicists
Academic staff of the University of Hong Kong
Academic staff of the Education University of Hong Kong
American expatriates in Hong Kong
American expatriate academics
Peace Corps volunteers